Farlim, officially Bandar Baru Air Itam, is a residential neighbourhood within the city of George Town in Penang, Malaysia. Over the recent decades, Farlim has evolved into a booming township, with several residential and commercial developments.

History 
The area where Farlim is located was previously known as Thean Teik Estate, which was named after Khoo Thean Teik, a local Chinese merchant. The area was owned by the Khoo Kongsi, a Chinese clan association in which Khoo was a director.

In 1978, Khoo Kongsi had reached an agreement with Farlim Group Berhad to develop Thean Teik Estate into a residential township. At the time, the project was the single largest property development ever undertaken by the private sector on Penang Island, with an area of  being originally earmarked for development. However, the commencement of construction works in 1982 was met by deadly protests by local residents. In the incident which pitted the residents against the police, one resident was killed and another four were injured.

Transportation 
Thean Teik Road and Thean Teik Highway are the two major roads that cut through the township. The former links Air Itam Road and the Paya Terubong suburb to the southwest, whereas the latter serves as a major thoroughfare between Paya Terubong and the Batu Lanchang suburb to the east.

Rapid Penang bus routes 13, 202, 203 and 306 also include stops within Farlim, thus connecting the township with George Town proper, the Penang International Airport and Queensbay Mall, as well as the Paya Terubong and Gelugor suburbs. These are complemented by Rapid Penang's Congestion Alleviation Transport (CAT) Air Itam route, a free-of-charge transit service within Air Itam.

Education 
There are two primary schools and a high school within the Farlim neighbourhood.

Primary schools
 SRK Seri Indah
 SRJK (C) Sin Kang
High school
 SMK Air Itam

Shopping 

All Seasons Place, Penang's first and only strip mall, was completed in 2012 and serves as the sole shopping mall within Farlim. It is anchored by HeroMarket, replacing the previous Giant and consists of several eateries and health-related outlets which are arranged along the Thean Teik Highway.

The local community's retail needs are also met by a Bandar Baru supermarket at the heart of the township. In addition, Suiwah Corporation, a local retail firm, has a considerable presence within Farlim. At the time of writing, it operates the Sunshine Farlim hypermarket, while the township's second shopping mall, Sunshine Tower, is under construction. In particular, the latter retail complex, scheduled for completion in 2019, will contain the first cineplex within Farlim as well.

See also 
 Air Itam

References

External links 
 Farlim Group Berhad 

Neighbourhoods in George Town, Penang